α-Cadinol or 10α-hydroxy-4-cadinene is an organic compound, a sesquiterpenoid alcohol.

Natural occurrence
This compound is found in essential oils and extracts of many plants, such as 
Agrotaxis selaginoides,
 Tabernaemontana catharinensis
 Litsea acutivena (7.7%),
 Salvia aratocensis (20%),
 Protium giganteum (7%),
 Uvaria ovata root bark (13–24%),
 Plinia trunciflora (19%)
 Tanacetum sonbolii (35%)
 Schisandra chinensis berries (5%),
 Melia azedarach (11%),
 Neolitsea parvigemma (10%),
 Tetradenia riparia (8%)

Biological activity
α-Cadinol was said to act as anti-fungal and as hepatoprotective, and was proposed as a possible remedy for drug-resistant tuberculosis.

See also
 δ-Cadinol (torreyol)

References

Sesquiterpenes
Tertiary alcohols
Alkene derivatives
Isopropyl compounds